Witless Protection is a 2008 American crime comedy film written and directed by Charles Robert Carner, and starring Larry the Cable Guy and Jenny McCarthy. Distributed by Lionsgate, the film was theatrically released on February 22, 2008 to extremely negative reviews and commercial failure, grossing $4.1 million. It was the final film appearance of Yaphet Kotto before his retirement later that year from acting and 2021 death.

Plot 
Larry Stalder is a small-town deputy who dreams of becoming an FBI agent. He witnesses what he believes is a kidnapping and rushes to rescue a woman named Madeleine. The "kidnappers" turn out to be FBI agents assigned to protect her and deliver her to a big Enron-type corruption trial in Chicago.

After the misunderstanding is cleared, Larry attempts to deliver Madeleine to the agents and get a commendation letter from them until he discovers that they're corrupted. It's later revealed that they work for Arthur Grimsley, the criminal whom Madeleine is going to testify against, who also dumped her. While spending the night at a motel, Larry and Madeleine are found by the agents and escape. During their journey, they discover that the evidence against Arthur, contained within a disc, was stolen and is inside a safe in Arthur's mansion. After evading capture from Wilford Duvall, Arthur's head of security, they manage to keep the villains off track by faking Madeleine's death. Arriving in Chicago, Larry enters a charity polo match to get invited to a ball at Arthur's mansion. He manages to beat Arthur, who at first denies to invite him to the ball until Larry convinces him otherwise.

At the ball, Larry searches for the disc while Madeleine dances with Arthur to distract him. During the search, Larry encounters and defeats Wilford in the display room of the mansion. He then bargains with one of the corrupted FBI agents to let him go, in exchange for the money in the safe. After getting the disc, Larry and Madeleine manage to escape after Arthur easily deduces her identity and holds her hostage, forcing Larry to give him the disc to save Madeleine. It is later revealed that the disc Larry gave to Arthur was a video of him singing his favorite country song.

After sending Arthur to prison, Larry is offered to join the FBI but he turns it down. He and Madeleine say goodbye and part ways. Upon returning home, Larry becomes the new town sheriff and celebrates with his girlfriend Connie.

Cast
 Daniel Whitney (Larry the Cable Guy) as Deputy Larry Stalder
 Ivana Miličević as Madeleine
 Jenny McCarthy as Connie
 Joe Mantegna as Dr. Rondog "Doc" Savage
 Yaphet Kotto as Ricardo Bodi / Alonzo Mosley
 Richard Bull as Sheriff Smoot
 Eric Roberts as Wilford Duvall
 Peter Stormare as Arthur Grimsley
 J David Moeller as Elmer
 Sean Bridgers as Norm

Production
Many parts of the film were filmed in Plano, Illinois and Virgil, Illinois (train depot, farms, gas station and a few downtown restaurants). Filming also took place in numerous towns in Illinois including Elmhurst, Lombard, Lemont, Sugar Grove, Glen Ellyn, Vernon Hills, Westmont and Yorkville.

Reception

Critical response
Witless Protection received near unanimously negative reviews from critics. On Rotten Tomatoes, it has an approval rating of 4% based on 28 reviews, with an average rating of 2.58/10. The site's consensus states: "Larry the Cable Guy continues his critical losing streak with this insipid, tasteless caper comedy." On Metacritic it has an average score of 17 out of 100, based on 6 reviews.

Frank Scheck of The Hollywood Reporter wrote: "[I]n the press notes for Larry the Cable Guy's latest comedy, his co-stars are quoted at length describing the constant hilarity they experienced on the set. Unfortunately for filmgoers, little of that fun has made its way into the finished product, which makes his previous effort, Delta Farce, seem a classic by comparison." John Anderson of Variety criticized the film for carrying a "nasty edge" to its brand of blue-collar comedy aimed at Bush supporters and the misuse of McCarthy and Mantegna in embarrassing roles, concluding that: "One can only hope that Witless Protection is targeted at a vanishing species of American Neanderthal. In the meantime, perhaps Larry and his accomplices at Lionsgate could take some sensitivity training." Matt Zoller Seitz, writing for The New York Times, said "[T]he film's writer and director, Charles Robert Carner, is working on a critic-proof franchise and knows it; the slapstick and action set pieces are lame, and its performances range from competent to annoying." Steven Hyden of The A.V. Club gave the film an overall F grade, saying: "With Witless Protection—another lazy, wretched entry in an epically undistinguished filmography—Larry reveals that the joke is ultimately on his fans, and he's yukking it up all the way to the bank."

Accolades

The film was nominated for three Golden Raspberry Awards: Worst Actor for Larry the Cable Guy (who lost to Mike Myers for The Love Guru), Worst Supporting Actress for Jenny McCarthy (who lost to Paris Hilton for Repo! The Genetic Opera) and Worst Screen Couple for Larry the Cable Guy and Jenny McCarthy (they lost to Paris Hilton and either Christine Lakin or Joel David Moore for The Hottie and the Nottie).

References

External links
 Official minisite
 
 
 

2008 films
2008 comedy films
2000s crime comedy films
2000s police comedy films
American crime comedy films
Films about the Federal Bureau of Investigation
Films about witness protection
Films directed by Charles Robert Carner
Films set in Chicago
Films set in Mississippi
Films shot in Illinois
Lionsgate films
2000s English-language films
2000s American films